is a Japanese manga series written and illustrated by Miki Yoshikawa. It was originally published as a one-shot in September 2019, before beginning serialization in Kodansha's Weekly Shōnen Magazine in January 2020. An anime television series adaptation by Shin-Ei Animation and SynergySP aired from April to October 2022 on TV Asahi's NUMAnimation block.

Plot 
Nagi Umino is a 16-year-old second-year high school student who learns that he is not the biological child of the family that raised him. On the way to his first meeting with his biological family he meets Erika Amano, a popular internet celebrity who is trying to escape from an arranged marriage. Later, Nagi and Erika discover that the hospital had accidentally switched the two after their births and their parents were now aiming to put them in an arranged marriage; so they, selfishly, don't have to say goodbye to the children they raised (having missed out of their respective childhoods). To facilitate this, they are made to live in a house owned by Erika's family; hoping they two will fall in love before graduation, but will respect their wishes to abandon the idea if nothing comes of it.

Characters 
 
 
 A second-year student at Megurogawa Academy, who is ranked second in his grade. He is the biological son of a hotel tycoon, but due to a mix-up after his birth is raised by a different family. He has a crush on his classmate Hiro Segawa and aims to confess to her once he beats her in the school rankings. Following a challenge which he won, he starts dating Hiro. However, he starts to develop feelings toward Erika after realizing he hurt her because he choose Hiro.
 
 
 A popular Instagram celebrity who is the biological daughter of the family that raised Nagi. She first meets him while taking videos at a park, and makes him pretend to be her boyfriend to escape from an arranged marriage, unaware that her parents arranged her to be engaged to Nagi and for them to live together in a single house. After her school discovers the pictures she took with him, she is forced to transfer to Nagi's school. She decided to start an Instagram account in order to reach someone she had been looking for. Erika later realizes she really is in love with Nagi, as she is hurt when he chose Hiro instead of her.
 
 
 Nagi's adoptive sister and Erika's biological sister. She is scared that Nagi will leave her, and later she runs away from home and moves to the house where Nagi and Erika are staying. Later on in the series, she decides to aim for enrolling in Nagi and Erika's school after graduating from junior high school. She also has feelings for Nagi, which grew after she learned they are not blood-related.
 

 Nagi's classmate who is ranked first in her grade. She lives in a temple and also works as a miko. She later becomes friends with Erika. It is later revealed that she is also engaged to someone else. Later on, it is suggested that she has developed feelings for Nagi although she wants Nagi to get together with Erika. She sometimes shows yandere tendencies towards Nagi.
 
 Nagi's childhood friend, who moved to China when she was a child due to her father's work, and returns to Japan for Nagi. She is also a popular online singer. She has loved Nagi since childhood, to the point of decorating her room with pictures of him.
 
 
 Nagi's adoptive father. Erika and Sachi's biological father. He and his wife Namie run a restaurant together.
 
 
 Nagi's adoptive mother. Erika and Sachi's biological mother. She and her husband Yōhei run a restaurant together.
 
 
 Erika's adoptive father. Nagi's biological father. He is the owner of a hotel chain.
 
 
 Erika's adoptive mother. Nagi's biological mother. She works as a television producer.

Production 
A Couple of Cuckoos is the first manga series in which Miki Yoshikawa uses digital drawing.

Media

Manga 
Miki Yoshikawa first published the series as a one-shot in Weekly Shōnen Magazine in September 2019, as part of a promotion in which she would publish three one-shots and readers could vote on which would receive a serialization. The series began serialization in Weekly Shōnen Magazine on January 29, 2020. The first tankōbon volume was released on May 15, 2020. A promotional video for the series was released on June 11, 2020. The video was voiced by Yūma Uchida and Maaya Uchida, who are siblings. As of December 2022, fifteen volumes have been released.

The manga series has been licensed in digital in North America by Kodansha USA.

Volume list

Anime 
In April 2021, an anime television series adaptation was announced. It is animated by Shin-Ei Animation and SynergySP and directed by Yoshiyuki Shirahata, with Hiroaki Akagi serving as chief director, Yasuhiro Nakanishi overseeing series scripts, and Aya Takano designing characters. The series aired from April 24 to October 2, 2022, on TV Asahi's  block. It aired for two consecutive cours. The first opening theme song is "Dekoboko" (凸凹, Rough) by Kiyoe Yoshioka, vocalist of the Japanese duo Ikimonogakari, while the ending theme song is "Shikaku Unmei" (四角運命, Square Destiny) by Sangatsu no Phantasia. The second opening theme is "Glitter" by Sumika, while the second ending theme is "HELLO HELLO HELLO" by Eir Aoi. Crunchyroll licensed the series outside of Asia. A spin-off mini anime series titled Kakkō no Iikagen premiered on YouTube on April 28, 2022.

On April 11, 2022, Crunchyroll announced that the series will receive an English dub, which premiered on May 7. However, the English dub of the series was produced in Coppell studios in what was Funimation, who acquired Crunchyroll in August 2021 and Sony rebranded Funimation as Crunchyroll in March 2022. On July 10, 2022, a promotional video for the second cours starting on July 23 was released. Eir Aoi will perform the new ending theme song "HELLO HELLO HELLO".

Episode list

Reception 
It was reported that the first volume of the manga sold out in stores due to high demand, and that sales exceeded the publisher and author's expectations. A Couple of Cuckoos ranked #12 on Takarajimasha's Kono Manga ga Sugoi! list of best manga of 2021 for male readers. The series ranked #5 on the "Nationwide Bookstore Employees' Recommended Comics of 2021" by the Honya Club website. The manga has been nominated for the 46th Kodansha Manga Award in the shōnen category in 2022.

Notes

References

External links 
  
  
 Official Twitter account 
 

2022 anime television series debuts
Anime series based on manga
Crunchyroll anime
Fiction about social media
Harem anime and manga
Kodansha manga
NUManimation
Romantic comedy anime and manga
School life in anime and manga
Shin-Ei Animation
Shōnen manga